Chrysolarentia subrectaria is a species of moth of the  family Geometridae. It is found in New Zealand and Australia, including Tasmania.

References

Euphyia
Moths of Australia
Moths described in 1857
Moths of New Zealand
Taxa named by Achille Guenée